Samos Prefecture was a prefecture in Greece, consisting of the islands of Samos, Ikaria and the smaller islands of Fournoi Korseon. In 2011 the prefecture was abolished and the territory is now covered by the regional units of Samos and Ikaria. Its capital was the town of Vathy, on Samos.

Provinces
The provinces were:
 Samos Province - Samos
 Ikaria Province - Agios Kirykos

Municipalities

See also
The Eupalinian aqueduct
List of settlements in Samos
List of settlements in the Ikaria regional unit

References

External links

Prefecture of Samos
Municipality of Vathy - The capital of Samos
Municipality of Pythagorion
Tunnel of Eupalinos
Port information Samos old port and new Marina for sailors

Prefectures of Greece
Geography of the North Aegean
History of Samos
Icaria
Fournoi Korseon
1915 establishments in Greece
States and territories established in 1915
2010 disestablishments in Greece
States and territories disestablished in 2010